Club Atlético Aldosivi (usually called simply Aldosivi) is an Argentine football club based in the city of Mar del Plata, Buenos Aires Province. The senior squad currently plays in Primera Nacional, the second division of the Argentine football league system.

The club also has a women's football section.

History

Foundation
The club was established on was founded on March 29, 1913, when a group of employees of the company that was building the port of Mar del Plata by then, met at El Recreo coffee house to establish a club where they could play the sport they loved.

The club's name comes from the first two letters of the last name of engineers and owners of the company commissioned to build the port: Allard, Doulfus, Sillard, and Wiriott (the "w" was changed to a "v" because there was no "W" available to telegraph the official announcement).

The first colors were taken from the French flag (blue, white and red), worn by the team during its first years of existence. Some time later, a local store donated the green and yellow jerseys in vertical stripes to the club. It became Aldosivi definitive colors, worn to present days.

Pedro Seré was elected as club's first president. He also established the "Asociación Marplatense de Football" (the first local league), headquartered at the port of Mar del Plata on Figuero Alcorta street.

First success
With football as the main activity of the institution, the first notable achievement was the promotion to the first division of MDP in 1959. The Ministry of Public Works Stadium was Aldosivi's venue by then.

In 1973, Aldosivi played its first National Championship. The club returned to the top division competitions in 1975, achieving a well remembered win over Boca Juniors 2–1 at La Bombonera.

Apart from football, the club hosted other sports activities such as basketball, boxing and bowling, among others. These sections are no longer active.

In 1979, Aldosivi merged with two other clubs from Mar del Plata, Talleres and Banfield, and was known by the name Defensores del Puerto until 1981 when it returned to the traditional name, which it still uses today.

Players

Current squad
.

Out on loan

Former players

Managers
 Andrés Rebottaro (2004–05; 2007–09)
 Julio Toresani (2007)
 Salvador Daniele (2010–11) 
 Fernando Quiroz (2011–13; 2014–16)
 Sebastián Rambert (2013)
 Darío Franco (2013–14; 2016)
 Guillermo Hoyos (2019–21)
 Fernando Gago (2021)
 Martín Palermo (2021–2022)
 Leandro Somoza (2022-)

Honours

National 
 Primera B Nacional (1): 2017–18

Regional
Liga Marplatense de Fútbol:
First Division (6): 1973, 1974, 1975, 1989, 1993, 1994
Second Division (3): 1923, 1959, 1983
Third Division (2): 1941, 1944

References

External links

 
 Somos Aldosivi  (fan site)  
 La Cantera

Association football clubs established in 1913
Club Atletico Aldosivi
1913 establishments in Argentina
Football clubs in Mar del Plata